Ugolnye Kopi (lit. coal mines) is an urban locality (an urban-type settlement) in Anadyrsky District of Chukotka Autonomous Okrug, Russia, located east of Anadyr, the administrative center of the autonomous okrug, on the opposite side of the Anadyr River. It served as the administrative center of Anadyrsky District until June 2011. Population:  with an estimated population as of 1 January 2015 of 3,666.

It is a mainly mining town that also hosts the region's main airport.

History

Pre-history
Traces of fossil flora and fauna dating to the late Cretaceous and Paleocene were discovered on the territory of modern Ugolnye Kopi in 2003, in the area known as the Golden Ridge, in the Ugolnoye and Pervomaysky fields. These areas exhibit extensive fossil flora and fauna composition; the fossilized plant remains are well-preserved. There are currently about 130 items in the Chukotka Heritage Museum in Anadyr. Pollen grains extracted from the shells show that for about two million years ago coniferous and deciduous forests existed on the Gold Ridge.

In the sediments of the Golden Ridge, fossil remains of teeth, vertebrae, and jaw fragments have been found.

Modern history
It was founded at the beginning of the 20th century to provide accommodation and facilities for those working in or administering the nearby mines, hence the name, and later to provide the same services to those working in the air industry at the local airport.

Administrative and municipal status
Within the framework of administrative divisions, Ugolnye Kopi is directly subordinated to Anadyrsky District. As a municipal division, the urban-type settlement of Ugolnye Kopi is incorporated within Anadyrsky Municipal District as Ugolnye Kopi Urban Settlement.

Demographics
Ugolnye Kopi is located on the road between the Ugolny Airport and Shakhtyorsky. Unlike a large number of localities in the region, Ugolnye Kopi's demographics is mainly Caucasian. The Red Cross reports that only eighty-four people in Ugolnye Kopi are of indigenous origin; the remainder are of Slavic origin. This is as a result of the settlement's reason for existence being to provide accommodation and services to the local miners, servicemen, and aircraftmen, rather than it initially being an indigenous settlement that was turned into a collective farm such as, for example, Chuvanskoye.

Economy

Infrastructure
The settlement houses all district institutions and several military units. There are various stores, a post-office, a library, a hostel for children, the District Center of Children's Art, a youth sports school, a daycare center, Chukotka Economic Lyceum, a high school, the Municipal Center of Education, and a cultural center.

Transportation
The settlement is also home to the main airport in the autonomous okrug, the Ugolny Airport. This is the main transport hub for the region offering vital links to all airports within the district with Chukotavia as well as Alaska through Bering Air. In summer, those arriving to the airport and heading to Anadyr may do so using a ferry crossing; however, winter arrivals need to use the ice road across the Anadyr River which leads straight into the town.

Energy
In 2003, power cables were finally laid across the water from the Anadyr power station to these settlements. The use of natural gas as basic fuel will allow for the considerable improvement of the ecological situation in the autonomous okrug by decreasing the level of emissions in the atmosphere caused by coal burning. Hence the cost of power will drop, and reliability and quality of power supply will be higher.

Climate

See also
List of inhabited localities in Anadyrsky District

References

Notes

Sources

Petit Futé, Chukotka

External links
Ugolnye Kopi Photo Gallery
More photos of Ugolnye Kopi

Urban-type settlements in Chukotka Autonomous Okrug